The AMA Online Education Titans are a professional basketball team that play in the Filbasket. They are primarily base of varsity students from the AMA Computer University.

History
The AMA Computer University wanted to participate in college leagues such as the National Collegiate Athletic Association (NCAA) and the University Athletic Association of the Philippines (UAAP) but can't manage to gain membership due to these league being established already. The school's basketball team briefly participated in the now defunct Philippine Basketball League and later entered the PBA Developmental League (PBA D-League) in 2014 as the AMA Online Education Titans. At that time the only school based team was the joint ball club by the Centro Escolar University and Café France.

By 2017, AMA had already a letter of intent to join the top-tier professional Philippine Basketball Association (PBA) as an expansion team. They plan to join the league within the next two to three years.

At least from 2011 to 2017, AMA has not employ foreign basketball players and has been selecting school based players such as those from the NCAA, UAAP, the National Athletic Association of Schools, Colleges and Universities (NAASCU), and the National Capital Region Athletic Association (NCRAA).

References

Online Education Titans
PBA Developmental League teams